Soltan Soleyman (also Romanized as Solţān Soleymān) is a village in Soleyman Rural District, Soleyman District, Zaveh County, Razavi Khorasan Province, Iran. At the 2006 census, its population was 39, in 8 families.

References 

Populated places in Zaveh County